Vincent Leuluai (born 24 October 1995) is an Australian professional rugby league footballer who plays for the North Sydney Bears. He previously played for the Sydney Roosters.

Background
Born in Sydney, New South Wales, Leuluai is of Samoan descent and played his junior rugby league for the Minto Cobras.

He was educated at Sarah Redfern High School, Western Sydney. After finishing school he was signed by the Sydney Roosters.

Playing career

Early career
In 2012, Leuluai played for the Sydney Roosters S. G. Ball Cup team. From 2013 to 2015, he played for the Roosters' NYC team. In September and November 2013, he played for the Australian Schoolboys. On 1 October 2015, he was named as the NYC Players' Player award recipient.

2016
In February, Leuluai played for the Roosters in the 2016 NRL Auckland Nines. On 19 February, he made his first team debut for the Roosters in their 2016 World Club Series match against St. Helens, playing off the interchange bench in the Roosters' 38-12 win at Langtree Park. In Round 1 of the 2016 NRL season, he made his NRL debut for the Roosters against the South Sydney Rabbitohs. In July, he joined the Melbourne Storm mid-season on a contract until the end of 2018.

2017
Leuluai made his Melbourne Storm debut in round 2 of the 2017 season against the New Zealand Warriors. In November 2017 it was announced that he was returning to Sydney and had signed a new deal with the South Sydney Rabbitohs for 2018.

2018
On December 12, Leuluai signed a one year deal to join the North Sydney Bears from Souths.

References

External links
North Sydney Bears profile
South Sydney Rabbitohs profile
Sydney Roosters profile

1995 births
Living people
Australian rugby league players
Australian sportspeople of Samoan descent
Sydney Roosters players
Melbourne Storm players
North Sydney Bears NSW Cup players
Rugby league second-rows
Rugby league props
Rugby league players from Sydney